The JGR Class 5500 was a type of 4-4-0 steam locomotive used for 60 years on Japanese Government Railways. The locomotives were imported from the United Kingdom. Sulfur was added to the forged steel used for the cylinders. The cylinders were set in a slightly canted position, and were used without replacement for the entire life of the locomotive. Japan was unable to produce cylinders of comparable durability. In 1929, ten units were converted to tank locomotives and reclassified as Class B10. 

One Class 5500 locomotive, 5540, is preserved at the Ome Railway Park. A Class B10 locomotive, B104, is preserved at the Kominato Railway headquarters.

See also
 Japan Railways locomotive numbering and classification

References

4-4-0 locomotives
Steam locomotives of Japan
1067 mm gauge locomotives of Japan
Preserved steam locomotives of Japan
Passenger locomotives